Genaro Rodríguez Serrano (born 23 March 1998), is a Spanish professional footballer who plays for Málaga CF. Mainly a central defender, he can also play as a central midfielder.

Club career
Born in Gerena, Seville, Andalusia, Genaro was a Sevilla FC youth graduate. On 13 May 2016, he renewed his contract until 2019.

Genaro made his senior debut with the C-team on 17 September 2017, starting and being sent off in a 4–0 Tercera División home routing of CD San Roque de Lepe. He made his professional debut with the reserves the following 25 March, coming on as a late substitute for Curro in a 0–1 away win against Real Zaragoza in the Segunda División championship.

On 7 July 2018, Genaro renewed his contract until 2021. He made his first-team debut on 12 December 2019, starting and playing the full match in a 0–1 away loss against APOEL FC, on Sevilla's last group match of the 2019–20 UEFA Europa League.

On 5 October 2020, Genaro terminated his contract with the Nervionenses, and signed a one-year contract with CD Mirandés in the second division just hours later. He scored his first professional goal on 12 December, netting the game's only in an away success over CF Fuenlabrada.

On 13 August 2021, free agent Genaro agreed to a 1+1 deal with Málaga CF, still in the second tier.

Honours
Sevilla
UEFA Europa League: 2019–20

References

External links

1998 births
Living people
People from Sierra Norte (Seville)
Sportspeople from the Province of Seville
Spanish footballers
Footballers from Andalusia
Association football defenders
Association football midfielders
Segunda División players
Segunda División B players
Tercera División players
Sevilla FC C players
Sevilla Atlético players
CD Mirandés footballers
Málaga CF players
Spain youth international footballers
UEFA Europa League winning players